This list includes the biological mothers of the Georgian monarchs.

Mothers of the monarchs of the Kingdom of Iberia (302 BC–580)

Mothers of the monarchs of the Principality of Iberia (580–1008)

Mothers of the monarchs of the Kingdom of Georgia (1008–1490)

Mothers of the monarchs of the Kingdom of Kartli (1484–1762)

Mothers of the monarchs of the Kingdom of Kakheti (1490–1762)

Mothers of the monarchs of the Kingdom of Kartli-Kakheti (1762–1801)

Mothers of the monarchs of the Kingdom of Imereti (1490−1810)

See also
List of the mothers of the Ottoman Sultans
List of the mothers of the Safavid Shahs
List of the mothers of the Mughal Emperors

Georgia
mothers